Yunidis Castillo (born 6 June 1987) is a Paralympic athlete from Cuba competing mainly in category T46 sprint events.

She competed in the 2004 Summer Paralympics in Athens, Greece.  There she finished thirteenth in the women's Long jump - F44-46 event.  She also competed at the 2008 Summer Paralympics in Beijing, China. There she won a gold medal in the women's 100 metres - T46 event and a gold medal in the women's 200 metres - T46 event.

At the 2012 Summer Paralympics in London, she won gold medal in the women's 100 metres, 200 metres and 400 metres T46 events setting new world record in all of them.

She lost her right arm in a car accident at the age of 10.

References

External links
 
 Yunidis Castillo, the New Face of Cuban Disabled Sports by José Luis López, 14 September 2012.

1987 births
Living people
Cuban female sprinters
Cuban female long jumpers
Cuban amputees
Paralympic athletes of Cuba
Athletes (track and field) at the 2004 Summer Paralympics
Athletes (track and field) at the 2008 Summer Paralympics
Athletes (track and field) at the 2012 Summer Paralympics
Athletes (track and field) at the 2016 Summer Paralympics
Paralympic gold medalists for Cuba
Medalists at the 2008 Summer Paralympics
Medalists at the 2012 Summer Paralympics
Medalists at the 2016 Summer Paralympics
World record holders in Paralympic athletics
Paralympic medalists in athletics (track and field)
Medalists at the 2007 Parapan American Games
Medalists at the 2011 Parapan American Games
Medalists at the 2015 Parapan American Games
21st-century Cuban women